Twin Lake Township is one of sixteen townships in Hancock County, Iowa, USA.  As of the 2000 census, its population was 197.

History
Twin Lake Township was organized in 1882. It was named from two lakes in the southern part of the township.

Geography
According to the United States Census Bureau, Twin Lake Township covers an area of 35.77 square miles (92.64 square kilometers); of this, 35.32 square miles (91.48 square kilometers, 98.75 percent) is land and 0.45 square miles (1.16 square kilometers, 1.25 percent) is water.

Cities, towns, villages
 Goodell (west portion)

Adjacent townships
 Liberty Township (north)
 Ell Township (northeast)
 Avery Township (east)
 Pleasant Township, Wright County (southeast)
 Belmond Township, Wright County (south)
 Norway Township, Wright County (southwest)
 Amsterdam Township (west)
 Erin Township (northwest)

Major highways
  U.S. Route 69

School districts
 Belmond-Klemme Community School District
 West Hancock Community School District

Political districts
 Iowa's 4th congressional district
 State House District 12
 State Senate District 6

References
 United States Census Bureau 2008 TIGER/Line Shapefiles
 United States Board on Geographic Names (GNIS)
 United States National Atlas

External links
 US-Counties.com
 City-Data.com

Townships in Hancock County, Iowa
Townships in Iowa